Mount Coolum is a coastal suburb in the Sunshine Coast Region, Queensland, Australia.

Geography 
The Sunshine Motorway passes through the locality from the north-west (Coolum Beach) to the south-west (Marcoola). The David Low Way passes through the locality from north-east (Yaroomba) to south-east (Marcoola).

The mountain Mount Coolum (from which the suburb takes its name) is in the centre of the locality. Historically the mountain was known as Half Way Lump. The mountain is protected within the Mount Coolum National Park.

There is a sandy beach along the Coral Sea coast.

History 
The name Coolum derives from Kabi word gulum or kulum meaning without or wanting, probably referring to the Aboriginal legend of the mountain's head being knocked off in a fight with Ninderry, with the head becoming Mudjimba Island.

Amenities 
The Sunshine Coast Regional Council operates a mobile library service which visits Suncoast Beach Drive.

Education 
There are no schools in Mount Coolum. The nearest primary school is Coolum State School in neighbouring Coolum Beach. The nearest secondary school is Coolum State High School, also in Coolum Beach.

References

External links

 
 Mount Coolum Information from Coolum Website

Suburbs of the Sunshine Coast Region
Coastline of Queensland